The 340mm/45 Modèle 1912 gun (13.4 in) was a heavy naval gun of the French Navy. While the calibres of the naval guns of the French Navy were usually very close to those of their British counterparts, the calibre of 340 mm is specific to the French Navy.

They were carried by the s in twin turrets. Some of these guns were used as railway guns and coastal artillery in World War I, also serving in World War II.

Railway gun 
Due to the cancellation or conversion of most of the ships these guns were made for, the relatively large number of spare guns available facilitated their use as railway guns in both World Wars.  Two batteries of 340 mm guns, with an authorized strength of one gun per battery, were operated by the 53rd Coast Artillery, U. S. Army, in World War I. As with most French railway guns, after the Fall of France in World War II some of these weapons were used by the German army.  

Two different railway guns were produced from these surplus guns:
 Canon de 340 modèle 1912 à berceau - Six were converted by the St. Chamond company and saw action during both wars.
 Canon de 340 modèle 1912 à glissement - Six were converted by the Schneider company and these came too late for the First World War but participated in the Second World War.

Coast Defense Gun 
During Operation Dragoon, the Free French battleship  was one of the units engaged with 'Big Willie', ex-French turret battery controlling the approaches to Toulon. 'Big Willie' was armed with the guns taken from the French battleship , as a replacement for the original guns, sabotaged by its French crews, making this an unusual instance of both sides of an engagement using the 340mm/45 Modèle 1912 gun.

See also

Weapons of comparable role, performance and era
 BL 13.5 inch Mk V naval gun British equivalent
 14"/45 caliber gun US Navy equivalent

Gallery

Notes

Citations

Bibliography

External links 

 PIECES LOURDES : 240 et plus
 340 mm/45 (13.4") Model 1912

 

Naval guns of France
World War II naval weapons
340 mm artillery
Coastal artillery
Railway guns